FC Neded are a semi-professional football club based in the village of Neded, Slovakia. They play their home matches at the Stadium FC Neded. The club competes in 4. Liga, the fourth tier of the Slovak football league system.

First team squad

Updated 1 January 2021

Current technical staff 

Updated 1 January 2021

Managers
Information correct as of matches played 1 January 2021. Only competitive matches are included.

{| class="wikitable sortable"
|-
!Name!!From!!class="unsortable"|To!!Tenure!!P!!W!!D!!L!!GF!!GA!!Win%!!Honours
|-
|align=left| Jozef Mrllák
|align=left|
|align=left|
|align=center|
|align=center|
|align=center|
|align=center|
|align=center|
|align=center|
|align=center|
|align=center|
|-
|align=left| František Csöbönyei
|align=left|
|align=left|
|align=center|
|align=center|
|align=center|
|align=center|
|align=center|
|align=center|
|align=center|
|align=center|
|-
|align=left| Jozef Mrllák
|align=left|
|align=left|
|align=center|
|align=center|
|align=center|
|align=center|
|align=center|
|align=center|
|align=center|
|align=center|
|-
|align=left| Ladislav Kečkéš
|align=left|
|align=left|
|align=center|
|align=center|
|align=center|
|align=center|
|align=center|
|align=center|
|align=center|
|align=center|
|-
|align=left| Karol Karlík
|align=left|
|align=left|
|align=center|
|align=center|
|align=center|
|align=center|
|align=center|
|align=center|
|align=center|
|align=center|
|-
|align=left| Ladislav Kečkéš
|align=left|
|align=left|
|align=center|
|align=center|
|align=center|
|align=center|
|align=center|
|align=center|
|align=center|
|align=center|
|-
|align=left| Miroslav Lauko
|align=left|
|align=left|
|align=center|
|align=center|
|align=center|
|align=center|
|align=center|
|align=center|
|align=center|
|align=center|
|-
|align=left| 
|align=left|
|align=left|
|align=center|
|align=center|
|align=center|
|align=center|
|align=center|
|align=center|
|align=center|
|align=center|
|-
|align=left| Andrej Filip
|align=left|
|align=left|
|align=center|
|align=center|
|align=center|
|align=center|
|align=center|
|align=center|
|align=center|
|align=center|
|-
|align=left| Martin Kobora
|align=left|
|align=left|
|align=center|
|align=center|
|align=center|
|align=center|
|align=center|
|align=center|
|align=center|
|align=center|
|-
|align=left| Andrej Filip
|align=left|
|align=left|
|align=center|
|align=center|
|align=center|
|align=center|
|align=center|
|align=center|
|align=center|
|align=center|
|-
|align=left| 
|align=left|
|align=left|
|align=center|
|align=center|
|align=center|
|align=center|
|align=center|
|align=center|
|align=center|
|align=center|
|-
|align=left| 
|align=left|
|align=left|
|align=center|
|align=center|
|align=center|
|align=center|
|align=center|
|align=center|
|align=center|
|align=center|
|-
|align=left| Daniel Benkovský
|align=left|
|align=left|
|align=center|
|align=center|
|align=center|
|align=center|
|align=center|
|align=center|
|align=center|
|align=center|
|-
|align=left| Andrej Filip
|align=left|
|align=left|
|align=center|
|align=center|
|align=center|
|align=center|
|align=center|
|align=center|
|align=center|
|align=center|
|-
|align=left| 
|align=left|
|align=left|
|align=center|
|align=center|
|align=center|
|align=center|
|align=center|
|align=center|
|align=center|
|align=center|
|-
|align=left| Jozef Kováč
|align=left|
|align=left|
|align=center|
|align=center|
|align=center|
|align=center|
|align=center|
|align=center|
|align=center|
|align=center|
|-
|align=left| Tomáš Bartoš
|align=left|
|align=left|
|align=center|
|align=center|
|align=center|
|align=center|
|align=center|
|align=center|
|align=center|
|align=center|
|-
|align=left| Imrich Csillag
|align=left|
|align=left|
|align=center|
|align=center|
|align=center|
|align=center|
|align=center|
|align=center|
|align=center|
|align=center|
|-
|align=left| Miloš Lipovský
|align=left|
|align=left|
|align=center|
|align=center|
|align=center|
|align=center|
|align=center|
|align=center|
|align=center|
|align=center|
|}

League history
Slovak League only (1993–present)
{|class="wikitable" style="text-align:center;"
! style="color:#00308F; background:#FFBF00;"| Season
! style="color:#00308F; background:#FFBF00;"| Division (Name)
! style="color:#00308F; background:#FFBF00;"| Pos./Teams
! style="color:#00308F; background:#FFBF00;"| Pl.
! style="color:#00308F; background:#FFBF00;"| W
! style="color:#00308F; background:#FFBF00;"| D
! style="color:#00308F; background:#FFBF00;"| L
! style="color:#00308F; background:#FFBF00;"| GS
! style="color:#00308F; background:#FFBF00;"| GA
! style="color:#00308F; background:#FFBF00;"| P
! style="color:#00308F; background:#FFBF00;"|Slovak Cup
! style="color:#00308F; background:#FFBF00;"|Top Scorer (Goals)
|-
| 1993–94
| 6th (regional league)
| 7/(16)
| 30
| 14
| 5
| 11
| 53
| 42
| 33
|align=center|Did not enter
|align=center|
|-
| 1994–95
| 6th (regional league)
| 12/(16)
| 30
| 10
| 6
| 14
| 52
| 59
| 36
|align=center|Did not enter
|align=center|
|-
| 1995–96
| 6th (regional league)
| 4/(16)
| 30
| 15
| 8
| 7
| 61
| 40
| 50
|align=center|Did not enter
|align=center|
|-
| 1996–97
| 6th (regional league)
| 3/(13)
| 25
| 15
| 4
| 6
| 46
| 34
| 49
|align=center|Did not enter
|align=center|
|-
| 1997–98
| 5th (regional league)
| 11/(16)
| 30
| 13
| 2
| 15
| 58
| 60
| 41
|align=center|Did not enter
|align=center|
|-
| 1998–99
| 5th (regional league)
| 3/(16)
| 30
| 16
| 5
| 9
| 78
| 43
| 53
|align=center|Did not enter
|align=center|
|-
| 1999–00
| 5th (regional league)
| bgcolor=gold|1/(16)
| 30
| 20
| 2
| 8
| 101
| 43
| 62
|align=center|Did not enter
|align=center|
|-
| 2000–01
| 4th (regional league)
| bgcolor=gold|1/(16)
| 30
| 20
| 4
| 6
| 72
| 41
| 64
|align=center|Did not enter
|align=center|
|-
| 2001–02
| 3rd (third league - west)
| 12/(16)
| 30
| 12
| 1
| 17
| 53
| 56
| 37
|align=center|Did not enter
|align=center|
|-
| 2002–03
| 3rd (third league - west)
| 14/(16)
| 30
| 5
| 9
| 16
| 26
| 60
| 24
|align=center|Did not enter
|align=center| Peter Sládeček (7)
|-
| 2003–04
| 3rd (third league - west)
| bgcolor=red|16/(16)
| 30
| 3
| 5
| 22
| 22
| 87
| 14
|align=center|Did not enter
|align=center| Ivan Jedinák (5)
|-
| 2004–05
| 4th (regional league)
| 5/(16)
| 30
| 14
| 5
| 11
| 53
| 44
| 47
|align=center|Did not enter
|align=center| Ladislav Beneš (12)
|-
| 2005–06
| 4th (regional league)
| 4/(15)
| 28
| 16
| 6
| 6
| 67
| 32
| 54
|align=center|Did not enter
|align=center| Ladislav Beneš (17)
|-
| 2006–07
| 4th (regional league)
| 15/(16)
| 30
| 10
| 2
| 18
| 33
| 60
| 32
|align=center|Did not enter
|align=center| Slavomír Konc (17)
|-
| 2007–08
| 4th (regional league)
| 4/(16)
| 30
| 14
| 6
| 10
| 46
| 30
| 48
|align=center|Did not enter
|align=center| Adrián Paštiak (13)
|-
| 2008–09
| 4th (regional league)
| 8/(16)
| 30
| 14
| 3
| 13
| 61
| 44
| 45
|align=center|Did not enter
|align=center| Vladimír Rožník (18)
|-
| 2009–10
| 4th (regional league)
| bgcolor=red|15/(16)
| 30
| 11
| 4
| 15
| 40
| 55
| 37
|align=center|Did not enter
|align=center| Emil Ivanič (10)
|-
| 2010–11
| 5th (regional league)
| 3/(16)
| 28
| 17
| 6
| 7
| 73
| 35
| 57
|align=center|Did not enter
|align=center| Adam Bombicz (13)
|-
| 2011–12
| 5th (regional league)
| bgcolor=gold|2/(16)
| 30
| 19
| 4
| 7
| 56
| 40
| 61
|align=center|Did not enter
|align=center| Lajos Kalmár, Adam Polednák (8)
|-
| 2012–13
| 4th (regional league)
| 15/(16)
| 28
| 6
| 3
| 19
| 37
| 42
| 21
|align=center|Did not enter
|align=center| Dušan Krcho (6)
|-
| 2013–14
| 4th (regional league)
| bgcolor=gold|5/(16)
| 30
| 15
| 8
| 7
| 67
| 30
| 53
|align=center|Did not enter
|align=center| Šimon Valachovič (13)
|-
| 2014–15
| 3rd (third league - West - South West)
| 4/(18)
| 32
| 15
| 10
| 7
| 40
| 32
| 55
|align=center|Did not enter
|align=center| Šimon Valachovič (14)
|-
| 2015–16
| 3rd (third league - West - South West)
| 16/(18)
| 32
| 6
| 9
| 17
| 40
| 62
| 27
|align=center|2.R, 2–6 (FC Slovan Galanta)
|align=center| Šimon Valachovič (7)
|-
| 2016–17
| 3rd (third league - West - South West)
| bgcolor=red|19/(19)
| 36
| 6
| 6
| 24
| 38
| 85
| 24
|align=center|Did not enter
|align=center| Obassi Fritz Ambassa (10)
|-
| 2017–18
| 4th (regional league)
| |9/(16)
| 30
| 11
| 5
| 14
| 46
| 46
| 38
|align=center|Did not enter
|align=center| Tomas Kunovsky (10)
|-
| 2018–19
| 4th (regional league)
| |8/(16)
| 26
| 9
| 7
| 10
| 30
| 35
| 34
|align=center|Did not enter
|align=center| Denis Galbavy (5)
|-
| 2019–20
| 4th (regional league)
| |5/(16)
| 16
| 8
| 3
| 5
| 34
| 26
| 27
|align=center|Did not enter
|align=center| Martin Bocian (10)
|-
| 2020–21
| 4th (regional league)
| |11/(16)
| 15
| 5
| 1
| 9
| 30
| 47
| 16
|align=center|Did not enter
|align=center| Stanislav Jašík (7)
|-
| 2021–22
| 4th (regional league)
| bgcolor=red|16/(19)
| 30
| 9
| 4
| 17
| 40
| 81
| 31
|align=center|Did not enter
|align=center| Ladislav Pataši (8)
|-
| 2022–23
| 5th (regional league)
| | /(16)
| 
| 
| 
| 
| 
| 
|  
|align=center|Did not enter
|align=center|
|}

Records and statistics

Record league win: 11–0 (against TJ Mýtna Nová Ves, 8. Juny 1999).
Record league defeat: 0–10 (against ŠK LR Crystal Lednické Rovne, 31. May 2004).
Record home League attendance: 1500 (against TJ Družstevník Topoľníky, won 3–1, 26. August 2009).
Most league goals in one season: Vladimír Rožník, 18 (during the 2008-2009 season).
Most goals scored by player in a league match: Mário Klajman, 5 goals, won 9–0, (against TJ Družstevník Veľké Kostoľany, 6 November 2001), Šimon Valachovič, 5 goals, won 10–0, (against TJ Družstevník Topoľníky, 6 April 2014).

References

External links
nove vedenie-novy trener 
Remekeltek a Negyediek 2000/01 
hodnotenie po jeseni 2002/03 
hodnotenie po sezone 2002/03 
zostava FC Neded pred novou sezónou 2015/2016 
zostava FC Neded pred novou sezónou 2016/2017 
zhodnotenie sezony 2016/17 
zostava FC Neded pred novou sezónou 2017/2018

Football clubs in Slovakia